The 1898 Ole Miss Rebels football team represented the University of Mississippi during the 1898 Southern Intercollegiate Athletic Association football season. The season was the team's first in the Southern Intercollegiate Athletic Association (SIAA). Led by T. G. Scarbrough in his first and only season as head coach, Ole Miss compiled an overall record of 1–1.

Schedule

References

Ole Miss
Ole Miss Rebels football seasons
Ole Miss Rebels football